Austrogomphus pusillus, also known as Austrogomphus (Austrogomphus) pusillus, is a species of dragonfly of the family Gomphidae, 
commonly known as the tiny hunter. 
It is only known from one location, inhabiting a river in the Kimberley region, Western Australia.

Austrogomphus pusillus is a tiny, black and yellow dragonfly.

See also
 List of Odonata species of Australia

References

Gomphidae
Odonata of Australia
Insects of Australia
Endemic fauna of Australia
Taxa named by Yngve Sjöstedt
Insects described in 1917